Grand Theater is a metro station of Line 6 of Chongqing Rail Transit in Jiangbei District of Chongqing Municipality, China.

It serves the theater in which the station's name derived from (Chongqing Grand Theater) and its surrounding area, including the Chongqing Science and Technology Museum and office buildings in the Jiangbeizui CBD.

The station opened on December 30, 2014.

Station Structure

Floors
Due to its location below the car lanes of Qiansimen Jialing River Bridge and different elevations in its vicinity, the majority of the station is elevated (above ground, below the car lanes of the bridge), with the remainder being below ground (2 exits of the station).

Line 6 Platform
Platform Layout

A total of 2 side platforms are used for Line 6 trains travelling in both directions.

Exits
There are a total of 4 entrances/exits for the station.

Surroundings
Chongqing Grand Theater
Nearby Places
Qiansimen Jialing River Bridge
Chongqing Science and Technology Museum
Jiangbeizui CBD

Nearby Stations
Jiangbeicheng station (a Line 6 & Line 9 station)
Xiaoshizi station (a Line 1 & Line 6 station)

See also
Chongqing Grand Theater
Chongqing Rail Transit (CRT)
Line 6 (CRT)

References

Railway stations in Chongqing
Railway stations in China opened in 2014
Chongqing Rail Transit stations